Pierre Roy (10 August 1880 – 26 September 1950) was a French surrealist painter. He is known for his realistically painted compositions of ordinary objects in unexpected arrangements.

He was the eldest of four children of the secretary of the management board of the Musée d'Arts de Nantes who all became amateur painters. After gaining his baccalauréat at the local school he joined a firm of architects before enrolling at the Ecole des Beaux-Arts in Paris. Disappointed with the course, he left to work on the designs for the 1900 Paris Exposition.

In 1905, he decided to devote himself to painting, beginning in 1906 at the Salon of the Société Nationale des Beaux-Arts (SNBA), a painters collective. He exhibited in 1907, 1908, 1913 and 1914 at the Société des Artistes Indépendants. In 1925, he took part in the first exhibition by surrealist painters alongside Giorgio de Chirico, Max Ernst and Pablo Picasso, and in 1926 had his first solo exhibition. In 1933 he was appointed for five years as a naval artist.

An exhibition devoted to his work was held at the Galerie des Beaux-Arts in Paris in 1935, and his work was displayed at the 1937 World's Fair and the Montaigne Gallery in Paris in 1938. He travelled and exhibited in galleries around the world: in New York at the Brummer Gallery in 1930 and 1933, at the Julien Levy Gallery in 1932, at the Museum of Modern Art in New York in 1936, at the Carstairs Gallery in 1949, in London in 1934, at the Wildenstein Gallery and in Hawaii in 1939 at the Honolulu Academy of Arts.

In addition he created stage sets, several covers for Vogue magazine, and advertising posters.

His work is classed as surrealism, and is based on assemblages of everyday objects such as shells, vegetables and fruits, woollen reels, ears and seeds, eggs and ribbons arranged to create poetic images.

Work in public collections

 New York, Museum of Modern Art
 Danger dans l'escalier (Danger on the stairs), 1928, oil on canvas, 91 × 60 cm MoMA
 L'Heure d'été (Daylight Saving Time), 1929, oil on canvas, 54 × 38 cm MoMA
 Country Fair, c.1930, oil on canvas, 41 x 33 cm MoMA
Art Institute of Chicago
 Still Life, 1938, oil on canvas, 35 × 27 cm  AIC
Philadelphia Museum of Art
 Metric System, c.1933, oil on canvas, 146 x 99 cm  PMA
Tate Modern, London
 A Naturalist's Study, 1928, oil on canvas, 92 x 65 cm Tate
 Boris Anrep in his Studio, 65 Boulevard, Arago, 1949, oil on canvas, 65 x 50 cm Tate
 Nantes, France, Musée des Beaux-arts
 Adrienne pêcheuse (Adrienne the Fisherwoman), 1919, oil on canvas, 52 × 35 cm History of Art
 Paris, Musée National d'Art Moderne 
  Une Journée à la campagne (A Day in the Countryside), 1931, oil on canvas, 33 x 55 cm History of Art

Sources

 Pierre Roy, Musée des Beaux-Arts de Nantes et Somogy éditions d'art, Paris, 1994.
 Adam Biro and René Passeron, Dictionnaire général du surréalisme et de ses environs, Office du Livre, Fribourg, Switzerland and Presses universitaires de France, Paris, 1982, p. 370.
 Nicolas Blondel, « Les Folies douces de Monsieur Roy », Beaux Arts magazine, No 132, March 1995, p. 86 to 91.
Article based on a translation of the equivalent article on French Wikipedia

1880 births
1950 deaths
20th-century French painters
French surrealist artists